"Talk" is a song by American singer Khalid Robinson. It was written by Khalid and produced by English electronic music duo Disclosure. It was released on February 7, 2019, as the first single from Khalid's second studio album, Free Spirit. The song also appeared in the deluxe edition of Disclosure's third studio album, Energy. "Talk" became Khalid's fifth top 10 hit and highest-charting single as a solo artist in the US, peaking at number three on the Billboard Hot 100. The song was nominated for Record of the Year at the 62nd Grammy Awards.

Billboard ranked "Talk" 29th on their 100 Best Songs of 2019 list.

Music and composition
"Talk" is a midtempo, R&B-tinged song that runs for 3 minutes and 17 seconds. It features production and songwriting by English electronic music duo Disclosure, who incorporate synths that "bubble and twinkle above a staccato bass". Carolyn Bernucca of Complex magazine noted how Khalid "opts for a more mature vocal sound [...] without losing the youthful charm he's employed since American Teen".

Speaking on the conception of the song, Khalid said he initially met up with Disclosure, and they played him what he called a "crazy-ass instrumental". Khalid described "Talk" as the first taste of his second album, with the song's theme being "the beginning honeymoon stages of a relationship". Rap-Up said the song finds the singer "navigating the waters of a relationship".

Promotion and release
Khalid officially announced the song on Twitter on February 4, 2019, posting the cover art, which shows a purple wolf behind red flames. In late January, he had posted a video of himself listening to a clip of the song in his car. "Talk" was premiered as Zane Lowe's World Record on Apple Music's Beats 1 radio on February 7, 2019, and released the same day.

On August 28, 2020, "Talk" was also included as the 18th track in the deluxe edition of Disclosure's 3rd studio album ENERGY.

 Chart performance 
The song would go on to reach a peak of number three for four non-consecutive weeks on the Billboard Hot 100, and spent 11 weeks at the top of the Hot 100 Airplay chart, in addition to topping the Pop Songs, Rhythmic Songs, and Hip-Hop/R&B Airplay charts.

 Remixes 
Disclosure, who produced the original song, released their own house remix of "Talk" on March 29, 2019. This version of the song is titled "Talk (Disclosure VIP)".

A second official remix of "Talk" with American rappers Megan Thee Stallion and Yo Gotti was released on April 12, 2019. Billboard'' magazine reacted positively to Thee Stallion's verse, calling it "steamy", and complimented her singing but was less approving of Yo Gotti's feature, saying his "appearance feels much like he just stumbled into the wrong house and didn't know what he was getting himself into".

Charts

Weekly charts

Year-end charts

Certifications

Notes

References

2019 singles
2019 songs
Khalid (singer) songs
RCA Records singles
Number-one singles in New Zealand
Songs written by Khalid (singer)
Songs written by Guy Lawrence
Songs written by Howard Lawrence